Golam Faruq is a former Bangladeshi cricketer who played in five ODIs from 1986 to 1990. A right arm medium pacer and more than a useful lower-order batsman, Faruq (commonly known as Suru) was a regular with the national side throughout the 1980s.

In ODIs

He was one of the players who played in Bangladesh's first ever ODI against Pakistan. He didn't get much success with the ball at the highest level. But, as a batsman his 23* helped Bangladesh reach 3 figures against Sri Lanka in 88.

In ICC Trophy
He played in only four ICC Trophy matches, despite being part of three ICC Trophy teams.
In 1982, he didn't play any of the games. As a novice, he was mainly included in the touring party to get valuable experience in English conditions. He played two games in 1986, 2 more in 1990. Overall, he performed admirably with the ball, taking five wickets for 114 runs at an average of 22.80 per wicket. His best, 2/27 helped Bangladesh win a vital 2nd round match against Canada in 1990.

Other matches
As a bowler, his greatest moment came at Dhaka in January 1984. He took 6/10 (including a hat-trick) against Singapore in the opening match of the 1984 South-East Asia Cup.
He was a consistent performer in domestic cricket throughout the 1980s. He is considered one of the best Bangladeshi players of the 1980s.

References

Bangladesh One Day International cricketers
Bangladeshi cricketers
20th-century Bangladeshi cricketers
Living people
1962 births
Cricketers from Dhaka